In Sögubrot af nokkrum fornkonungum, Helgi the Sharp, prince of Zealand (Old Norse: Helgi Hvassi) was the brother of Hrœrekr Ringslinger, the king of Zealand, and they lived in the 7th century. Hrœrekr married Auðr the Deep-Minded, the daughter of king Ivar Vidfamne, but Auðr and Helgi felt attracted to each other. King Ivar saw an advantage in this and told Hrœrekr that Auðr was unfaithful with Helgi. Hrœrekr then killed Helgi and after this Hrœrekr was himself soon killed by his father-in-law Ivar who had one opponent less and wanted to include Zealand in his dominions.

Heroes in Norse myths and legends